Rychkovsky is a rural locality (a khutor) in Novomaximovskoye Rural Settlement, Surovikinsky District, Volgograd Oblast, Russia. The population was 66 as of 2010.

Geography 
Rychkovsky is located near the bank of the Tsimlyansk Reservoir, 59 km ESE of Surovikino (the district's administrative centre) by road. Verkhnechirsky is the nearest rural locality.

References 

Rural localities in Surovikinsky District